The China National Convention Center, previously known as the Olympic Green Convention Center is a convention center located in the Olympic Green in Beijing.

History

It was designed by RMJM and was originally used for the 2008 Summer Olympics and Paralympics. It covers an area of 270,000 square metres. It was one of the four principal buildings of the Olympic Green.

The convention center served as the competition spot for the fencing, and the shooting and fencing parts of the modern pentathlon events in the 2008 Summer Olympics and the boccia and wheelchair fencing events at the 2008 Summer Paralympics.

The International Broadcast Centre was located in this venue. and will be used again for the 2022 Winter Olympics.

Transportation
The nearest subway station is Aolinpike Gongyuan (Olympic Park) station (exit E) on Line 8 and Line 15 of Beijing Subway.

References

External links 

 

Venues of the 2008 Summer Olympics
Venues of the 2022 Winter Olympics
Convention and exhibition centers in China
Olympic International Broadcast Centres
Olympic fencing venues
Olympic modern pentathlon venues
Buildings and structures in Beijing